Pope Valley Union School District  is a small public school district based in Pope Valley, a rural part of northeastern Napa County, California, United States near Lake Berryessa. It operates a single elementary school, Pope Valley Union Elementary School, located at 6200 Pope Valley Road, Pope Valley, California 94567. The school has four classes, each consisting of two or three grades. The district has 5 teachers and 53 students, and has been described as "a throwback to simpler times".

References

External links
 

School districts in Napa County, California